Khvortab-e Rudbar (also Romanized as Khvortāb-e Rūdbār and Khowrtāb-e Rūdbār; also known as Khortāb Rūd and Khvortāb Rūd) is a village in Lavij Rural District, Chamestan District, Nur County, Mazandaran Province, Iran. At the 2006 census, its population was 93, in 26 families.

References 

Populated places in Nur County